Atzacan is a municipality in Veracruz, Mexico. It is located about 198 km from state capital Xalapa. It has a surface of 80.61 km2.

The municipality of Atzacan is delimited to the north by Chocaman, to the east by Iztaczoquitlán, to the south by Orizaba, to the south-west by Mariano Escobedo, to the west by La Perla, to the north-west by Coscomatepec de Bravo

It produces principally maize and beans.

A celebration in honor of Santa Ana, Patronress, takes place in April.

A large crowd attended the funeral of mayor Octavio Misael Lorenzo Morales on February 8, 2021, who died of COVID-19. As of this date, there have been 106 confirmed cases and ten deaths due to the virus in Atzacan. Few of the mourners practiced social distancing.

References

External links 

  Municipal Official Site
  Municipal Official Information

Municipalities of Veracruz